Hyon Song-wol (born 1977) is a North Korean singer, band leader, and politician. She is the leader of the Moranbong Band and of the Samjiyon Orchestra. She was formerly a featured vocalist for the Pochonbo Electronic Ensemble in the early 2000s, a pop group which found fame in North Korea in the late 1980s and 1990s. She has been a member in the Central Committee of the Workers' Party of Korea since 2017.

Early career 
Hyon was a vocalist for the Pochonbo Electronic Ensemble. Her biggest hit was the song "A Girl on a Steed", a 2005 song extolling the virtues of a Stakhanovite textile factory worker. The accompanying music video stars Hyon in the role of "the heroine, dashing around a sparkling factory with a beatific smile, distributing bobbins and collecting swatches of cloth at top speed." The lyrics include:

Our factory comrades say in jest,
Why, they tell me I am a virgin on a stallion,
After a full day's work I still have energy left...

They say I am a virgin on a stallion,
Mounting a stallion my Dear Leader gave me.
All my life I will live to uphold his name!

Hyon's other best known songs include, "Footsteps of Soldiers", "I Love Pyongyang", "She is a Discharged Soldier" and "We are Troops of the Party".

Marriage and rumors of involvement with Kim Jong-un 
Hyon disappeared from public view in 2006 when, according to reports in the Japanese media, she married a North Korean army officer with whom she had a child. She was reported to have known Kim Jong-un, the youngest son of former North Korean leader Kim Jong-il, since they were both teenagers. South Korean government sources told the media that Hyon and Kim Jong-un had been romantically involved in the early 2000s after he returned to North Korea from his studies at a public school in Switzerland. His father reportedly disapproved of the relationship and the younger Kim and Hyon broke it off.

Following Kim Jong-il's death in December 2011, Kim Jong-un was thought to have resumed the relationship. According to South Korean intelligence sources, "rumors about the two having an affair have been circulating among Pyongyang's top elite". 

In early July 2012, public interest in Kim Jong-Un's personal life increased when Korean Central Television, North Korea's state-run media station, released footage of Kim sitting next to a then-unidentified woman who frequently appeared with him in public events. South Korean intelligence officials initially identified the woman as Hyon. However, on 25 July 2012, North Korean media announced that the woman was Ri Sol-ju.

Execution rumor 
On 29 August 2013, The Chosun Ilbo reported that Hyon had been executed by firing squad on the orders of Kim Jong-un along with eleven other performers, including violinist Mun Kyong-jin, both of whom had allegedly made illegal pornographic videos. According to a source quoted by the newspaper, "They were executed with machine guns while the key members of the Unhasu Orchestra, the Wangjaesan Light Music Band and the Moranbong Band as well as the families of the victims looked on".

Pyongyang's state news agency KCNA denied claims that the singer was executed, and a Japanese news magazine reported that she was seen subsequently.

On 16 May 2014, Hyon appeared on North Korean television participating in the National Convention of Artists, disproving the rumors.

Later career 
Hyon is the leader of the Moranbong Band and of the Samjiyon Orchestra.

In December 2015, Hyon travelled to Beijing to perform with the Moranbong Band in a series of private concerts.

In 2017, she was appointed to the Central Committee of the Workers' Party of Korea. She participated in talks with South Korea to prepare for North Korea's participation in the 2018 Pyeongchang Winter Olympics. During the Games, she organized concerts by North Korean performers. 

Hyon's visibility in North Korean politics increased in 2020, when she made multiple appearances, including her inspection of typhoon-ravaged areas with Kim Jong-Un, in their country. She was re-elected to the Central Committee at the 8th Congress of the WPK.

See also
Media coverage of North Korea
List of North Korean musicians
Music of North Korea

Notes

References

External links

 

Living people
North Korean women singers
Place of birth missing (living people)
21st-century North Korean women politicians
21st-century North Korean politicians
1977 births
Korean-language singers
21st-century North Korean women
Members of the 8th Central Committee of the Workers' Party of Korea
21st-century women singers